Kymi is an electoral district represented in the Finnish Eduskunta (parliament). It covers the administrative regions of South Karelia and Kymenlaakso in south-eastern Finland, with a combined population of about 322,000. Kymi currently elects 12 members of the Eduskunta.

The constituency is largely urban and traditionally working-class. The largest party in the 2003 election was the Social Democratic Party of Finland.

2019–2023 members of parliament

Current members of parliament 2007–
 Sinikka Hurskainen (SDP)
 Jyri Häkämies (Kok.)
 Anneli Kiljunen (SDP)
 Valto Koski (SDP)
 Jari Larikka (Kok.)
 Markku Laukkanen (Kesk.)
 Reijo Paajanen (Kok.)
 Sirpa Paatero (SDP)
 Markku Pakkanen (Kesk.)
 Sari Palm (KD)
 Kimmo Tiilikainen (Kesk.)
 Pentti Tiusanen (Vas)
 KD = Christian Democrats
 Kesk. = Centre
 Kok. = National Coalition
 SDP = Social Democrats
 Vas. = Left Alliance
 Vihr. = Greens

Old election results

|}

See also
 Electoral districts of Finland

Parliament of Finland electoral districts
South Karelia
Kymenlaakso